Shūsaku, Shusaku or Shuusaku is a masculine Japanese given name. Notable people with the name include:

, Japanese swordsman
, Japanese professional Go player
, Japanese artist and architect
, Japanese author
, Japanese footballer
, Japanese footballer
, Japanese Paralympic swimmer
, Japanese footballer

Japanese masculine given names